Cristal may refer to:

 Cristal Global, chemical company
 Cristal (wine), a brand of champagne
 Cristal (aguardiente), brands of aguardiente
 Cristal (1985), a Venezuelan telenovela
 Cristal (2006), a Brazilian telenovela 
 Cristal, Rio Grande do Sul, a city in Brazil
 MS Cristal, a cruise ship
 Clube Atlético Cristal, a Brazilian football club
 Cristal, a prize awarded at the Annecy International Animation Film Festival
 Cristal, the iliac crest in supracristal plane
 Bic Cristal, a brand of disposable ballpoint pens
 Cristal, a typeface by French foundry Deberny & Peignot
 Cristal (album)

People with the surname
 Linda Cristal (1931–2020), Argentine actress

See also
 Crystal (disambiguation)
 Sporting Cristal, a Peruvian football team